Terzo d'Aquileia (officially Terzo di Aquileia; , locally ; : Ters) is a comune (municipality) in the Province of Udine in the Italian region Friuli-Venezia Giulia, located about  northwest of Trieste and about  south of Udine.

Terzo d'Aquileia borders the following municipalities: Aquileia, Cervignano del Friuli, Fiumicello Villa Vicentina, Grado, Torviscosa.

References

External links
 Official website

Cities and towns in Friuli-Venezia Giulia